Margaret Elaine Gardner  (born 19 January 1954) is an Australian academic and long serving university leader who is the current Vice-Chancellor of Monash University, in office since 2014. She was previously Vice-Chancellor and President of RMIT University from 2005 to 2014, and has a background in economics.

Education
Gardner earned a Bachelor of Economics with first class honours from the University of Sydney, and later a PhD with a thesis on Australian industrial relations. Following the completion of her PhD, she was awarded a Fulbright Postdoctoral Fellowship and studied in the United States at the University of California, Berkeley, Massachusetts Institute of Technology and Cornell University.

Career as an academic
Gardner has had a prominent career as an academic, and has served in executive positions with Deakin University, Griffith University and Queensland University of Technology.

Prior to her appointment as the Vice-Chancellor of RMIT, she was the Deputy Vice-Chancellor of the University of Queensland. Gardner was appointed Vice-Chancellor of RMIT on 4 April 2005, taking over from care-taker Vice-Chancellor Chris Whitaker.

She has been Vice-Chancellor of Monash University since 1 September 2014.

Vice-chancellor of RMIT
At the time of Gardner's appointment as vice-chancellor, RMIT was at a crucial point in its 118-year history. RMIT's previous vice-chancellor, Ruth Dunkin, resigned after only four years in the position and the university was fighting to overcome a A$24 million budget shortfall in 2004 that left it teetering on the edge of disaster.

By the end of her first year as vice-chancellor, RMIT had posted a A$23.2 million surplus for 2005 which increased to a A$50.1 million surplus by 2007. The fast turn around in finances at RMIT was achieved through the sale of property in the university's extensive real estate portfolio, a 9% increase in student fees and cutting 180 staff positions.

Other current leadership roles
Executive:
Chair of Universities Australia
President of RMIT International University Holdings Pty. Ltd.
President of the Museum Board of Victoria
Chair of the Australian Technology Network
Chair of the Education Advisory Group of the Council for Australia-Latin America Relations
Director of the Australian Teaching and Learning Council

Membership:
Business-Higher Education Collaboration Council of the Department of Education, Employment and Workplace Relations
Learning and Teaching Performance Fund Advisory Committee of the Department of Education, Employment and Workplace Relations
Enterprise-Connect Centre Advisory Board of the Department of Innovation, Industry, Science and Research
Melbourne Graduate School of Business' LH Martin Institute for Leadership and Management
Australian Defence Force's Reference Group on Women

Professional works
Gardner has authored, co-authored and edited a number of texts in the fields of industrial relations and human resource management, which have been widely used as course texts in Australian universities. She's also a regular contributor to a wide range of international journals and speaker at various academic and government conferences.

Between 1998 and 2002, as Chair of two major Queensland Government taskforces, Prof. Gardner also authored three government reviews: Queensland Industrial Relations Legislation, Pathways Articulation Through the Post-Compulsory Years of School to Further Education Training and Labour Market Participation.

A selection of Gardner's research is available from the RMIT Research Repository.

Controversy
In 2011 whilst Vice-Chancellor of RMIT, Gardner overturned the findings of an internal RMIT Redundancy Review Committee (RRC) and unlawfully terminated the employment of Social Sciences Professor Judith Bessant.  The RRC found that fair process had been not been followed by the university and that there had been a failure of natural justice. Despite these findings, Gardner decided to proceed to make Professor Bessant redundant.

On behalf of Bessant, the National Tertiary Education Union launched an "adverse action" claim against RMIT and Gardner in the Federal Court of Australia. The presiding judge, Justice Gray, was critical of Gardner's management of the case, especially given her considerable experience in industrial relations. In deciding the case, Gray also said he took into consideration the "apparent determination" by Gardner to "ignore her knowledge of Professor Hayward's animosity towards Professor Bessant". He also found that Gardner displayed a lack of contrition for what the court found to be a blatant contravention of workplace laws.

The Federal Court reinstated Bessant, and indicated that she would be entitled to approximately $2 million in compensation if she was not reinstated. The Court also ordered RMIT to pay a civil penalty of $37,000 for two contraventions of the Fair Work Act 2009, as a warning to employers of the risks of using "sham" redundancies as a means for dismissing difficult employees. The case was reported in the national media, in addition to becoming an important case study that is widely discussed on legal websites.

Bessant later published a personal account of the case.

Honours
In 2007, Gardner was made an Officer of the Order of Australia in the Australia Day Honours, for her "service to tertiary education, particularly in the areas of university governance and gender equity; and to industrial relations in Queensland". In 2020, she was upgraded to Companion of the Order of Australia for eminent service to tertiary education through leadership and innovation in teaching and learning, research and financial sustainability.

Gardner is also an Honorary Doctor of Griffith University, and in September 2018 was elected as a Fellow to the Academy of the Social Sciences in Australia for distinguished contribution to discipline and to society.

Gardner was advanced to Companion of the Order of Australia in the 2020 Australia Day Honours for "eminent service to tertiary education through leadership and innovation in teaching and learning, research and financial sustainability."

Personal life
When her husband Glyn Davis was Vice-Chancellor of the University of Melbourne, together they were regularly referred to as "Melbourne's top academic couple".

References

1954 births
Living people
University of Sydney alumni
Australian economists
Australian women economists
Vice-Chancellors of RMIT University
Companions of the Order of Australia
Officers of the Order of Australia
Academic staff of Monash University
Fellows of the Academy of the Social Sciences in Australia
Women heads of universities and colleges